Pat Boone is the first album by Pat Boone. Released by Dot Records in 1956, it compiled his recent hits such as "Ain't That a Shame", "At My Front Door", "Tutti Frutti", "Gee Whittakers", "I'll Be Home", with the addition of some newly recorded material.

Track listing

References 

1956 albums
Pat Boone albums
Dot Records albums